International Holocaust Cartoon Contest was a 2006 cartoon competition sponsored by the Iranian newspaper Hamshahri, to denounce what it called "Western hypocrisy on freedom of speech". The event was staged in response to the Jyllands-Posten Muhammad cartoons controversy. Several public figures, including the United States State Department, the Israeli Foreign Ministry, and United Nations Secretary General Kofi Annan strongly criticized the contest.

In January 2015, in the wake of the Charlie Hebdo shooting and the magazine's subsequent decision to publish further cartoons of Muhammad, the Iranian House of Cartoon and the Sarcheshmeh Cultural Complex in Iran announced that they would be sponsoring The 2nd International Holocaust Cartoons Contest. Selected cartoons were exhibited in Tehran beginning on May 14, 2016.

2006 competition

On February 6, 2006, Farid Mortazavi, graphics editor of Hamshahri, announced a competition for cartoons on the Holocaust. The twelve best contributions were to be rewarded with a gold coin each, which were later increased to $5,000 to $12,000 prizes for the top 3 cartoons and 3 gold coins each for 12 other cartoonists. Later, Hamshahri published an English introduction to the contest, as well as preliminary rules.

The contest was created in response to the twelve cartoons published by the Danish newspaper Jyllands-Posten (see Jyllands-Posten Muhammad cartoons controversy) to challenge the championing of freedom of speech in the defense of the Jyllands-Posten cartoons. This was done under the notion that those who supported the Jyllands-Postens right to free anti-Islamic speech would be placed in a precarious position were they to condemn the antisemitic cartoons targeted at one of the most sensitive of Jewish topics. In that introductory message for the contest, Hamshahri denounced what they called Western hypocrisy on freedom of speech, alleging that "it is impossible in the West to joke upon or even discuss certain topics related to Judaism, such as the Holocaust, and the pretexts for the creation of Israel."

On February 14, 2006, the editor in chief of Hamshahri commented in Persian that "the purpose of establishing such a competition is not to offend or ridicule anyone, but to do a discussion about the realities of the Holocaust." He also indicated that Hamshahri tries really hard not to cause pain for anyone and also added that the newspaper has no contention with the Jews in Iran or any other place, but that it has problems with Zionism. Masood Shojaei, the director of Iran's Caricature House which cosponsored the competition also said: "Iran's Caricature House, as the only technically qualified center involved in the competition regards the Holocaust topic as a terrible and saddening issue". The exhibition put on by The Iran Cartoon Organisation and Hamshahri newspaper opened on August 14, 2006.

After the winners were announced in November 2006, Shojaei said the competition would become an annual event. The Associated Press quoted him as saying "Actually, we will continue until the destruction of Israel". However, Shojaei categorically denies that he even spoke to the Associated Press reporter.

Reactions

In Iran
Conservative newspapers such as Kayhan and Jomhouri Eslami have hailed the decision by Hamshahri for the contest, and their cartoonists, such as Maziyar Bizhani have actively entered the competition.

Several reformers criticized the cartoon competition and also the president's statements about the Holocaust. Emadeddin Baghi, a member of the religious-intellectuals circle, Ebrahim Yazdi, the head of Nehzat Azadi Party, Hamid Reza Jalaeipour, a prominent figure of Islamic Iran Participation Front and Sadeq Zibakalam, a prominent political analyst of the Kargozaran party criticized these new policies by calling them "useless, scientifically-baseless and purely political actions which originates  from the authorities' lack of historical knowledge". In an interview with BBC, Nikahang Kowsar, a former cartoonist for Hamshahri, said he thought the competition was the wrong approach. "It's a bad reaction to a bad action coming from the Danish newspaper", he told the BBC. He also claimed in his weblog that, Hamshahri cartoonists will have a bad fate if they refuse to take part in the competition.

In Israel
Israeli artists spoofed the contest by the Israeli antisemitic cartoons contest.

International

On February 8, 2006 Flemming Rose (the cultural editor for Jyllands-Posten), told CNN: "My newspaper is trying to establish a contact with that Iranian newspaper Hamshahri, and we would run the cartoons the same day as they publish them". Later that day, the paper's editor-in-chief said that Jyllands-posten would under no circumstances publish the Holocaust cartoons.

Six of the least controversial cartoons of the International Holocaust Cartoon Competition were republished by Danish Newspaper Dagbladet Information on September 8, 2006 after the editor consulted the main rabbi in Copenhagen, and three cartoons were later reprinted in Jyllands-Posten as well.

The event was also criticised by the then United Nations Secretary-General Kofi Annan, the U.S. State Department, the Israeli foreign ministry, Reporters Without Borders, the Anti-Defamation League and other parties.

Winners 
 
On November 1, 2006, political cartoonist Abdellah Derkaoui, a Moroccan, was announced as the winner and received the first prize of US$12,000. Derkaoui's winning cartoon differed from many of the runners-up, in that it did not deny the Holocaust; instead, it used the Holocaust to make a comparison between the actions of Nazi Germany and the current actions of the Israeli government.

The second prize of US$8,000 was split to Brazilian cartoonist Carlos Latuff and far-right cartoonist Chard, from France, although Chard refused the prize, stating that her cartoon was entered into the competition without her consent. According to the Jerusalem Center for Public Affairs, the cartoon by Chard contains explicit Holocaust denial.

Shahram Rezai of Iran won the third prize of US$5,000. In addition to the main prizes, there were also 'Special Prizes' awarded to several entries, in which each was awarded with three gold coins. One of these prizes went to Italy, one prize to Morocco, two to Jordan, one to Syria, two to Brazil, and five went to Iranians.

2016 competition 
In December 2015, two state-sponsored Iranian cultural organizations, the Owj Media & Art Institute and the Sarcheshmeh Cultural Complex, announced a Holocaust cartoon contest. Over 150 cartoons from the contest made up a May 2016 exhibition in the art section at the Islamic Propaganda Organization in Tehran, as part of Iran's Cartoon Biennial. After the closing of the Tehran exhibition at the end of May 2016, the Islamic Propaganda Organization sponsored exhibitions of selected cartoons in provincial capitals throughout the country.

Reactions

In Iran
In an April 2016 interview published in the New Yorker, Iranian Foreign Minister Mohammad Javad Zarif tried to distance the Iranian government from the contest, asserting that it did not receive government support or endorsement, and that no official permission was necessary to hold it. Following Zarif's statement, a spokesperson from the Ministry of Culture and Islamic Guidance questioned the Foreign Minister's comments, stating that the Ministry supports any program that will "enlighten people about the Holocaust". The main spokesperson for the contest, Mas`oud Shoja'i Tabataba'i, said that Zarif was not welcome at the exhibition. Zarif was questioned in the Iranian parliament about his negative position on the Holocaust cartoon contest and exhibition three months after its closing. He maintained his belief that Holocaust denial does not benefit the Islamic Republic of Iran and he repeated the claim that the contest was the work of an NGO and not any government agency.

International
American political cartoonist Daryl Cagle entered a cartoon into the Second Holocaust Cartoon Competition in 2015. The cartoon features Iran's Supreme Leader with his face in the shape of a pair of human buttocks: the face / posterior is farting out the words to his famous statement, "The Holocaust is an event whose reality is uncertain and if it has happened, it's uncertain how it happened."

"I'm guessing the Iranians will not choose to include my cartoon in their exhibition and competition – but considering how the contest organizers complain about the "West" censoring "discussion" of the Holocaust, I thought it was a nice irony to give them a Holocaust cartoon that they would likely censor," writes Cagle.

Irina Bokova, Director-General of UNESCO condemned the holding of it: "Such an initiative which aims at a mockery of the genocide of the Jewish people, a tragic page of humanity's history, can only foster hatred and incite to violence, racism and anger. This contest goes against the universal values of tolerance and respect, and runs counter to the action led by UNESCO to promote Holocaust education, to fight anti-Semitism and denial."

Winners 
On May 31, 2016, French cartoonist Zeon was announced as the winner and received the first prize of US$12,000. The cartoonist was arrested by the French authorities back in March 2015 for his anti-Semitic work that he drew back in 2011. His winning work features what appears to be the entry gate of a Nazi-era death camp atop a cash register with six million in cash inside.

Indonesian artist Jitet Koestana won the second prize of US$7,000 while Mahmud Nazari from Iran won the third prize of US$5,000. In addition to the main prizes similar to the 2006 contest, there were also 'Special Prizes' awarded to several entries, in which each was awarded with three gold coins. One of these prizes went to Belgium, Morocco, Turkey and several other countries.

The Belgian winner, Luc Descheemaeker using the name O-sekoer, is a schoolteacher in a Catholic school in the Flemish city of Torhout. The school and the city felt very honored that he won a prize at that contest. Even the Flemish press took his defense towards Jewish organisations condemning the contest. The mayor of the city is the Flemish minister of education, Hilde Crevits who refused to condemn the cartoon. Descheemaeker was consequently nominated cultural ambassador of the city of Torhout. Meanwhile other antisemitic cartoons drawn by him were discovered.

After the contest, the Iranian House of Cartoon and the Sarcheshmeh Cultural Complex announced another similar contest, this time calling for cartoon submissions on the  "Zionist Caliphate" that will focus on "Zionism, terrorism and racism" and "ISIL terrorism and genocide in the name of religion and to the benefit of the Zionists." The deadline for entries has been set for 16 June 2016, with the winners to be announced at a later date with cash prizes of up to US$5,000.

See also

Council for Spreading Mahmoud Ahmadinejad's Thoughts
Everybody Draw Mohammed Day
International Conference to Review the Global Vision of the Holocaust
Israeli Anti-Semitic Cartoons Contest
The Eternal Jew (art exhibition)

References

External links
 The Winners of the Competition (mirror)
 The Iran Cartoon Organisation (Persian)
 The Iran Cartoon Organisation (English)

Holocaust Cartoon Competition
2006 controversies
Holocaust denial in Iran
Antisemitic works
Works about censorship
Events relating to freedom of expression
Antisemitic propaganda
Editorial cartoons
Holocaust denial
Antisemitism in Iran
Antisemitism in Asia
Antisemitism in the Middle East
Jyllands-Posten Muhammad cartoons controversy
Cartoon controversies